Jerome Williams (born May 10, 1973) is an American former professional basketball player active in the NBA between 1996 and 2005. Williams played for the Detroit Pistons, Toronto Raptors, Chicago Bulls, and the New York Knicks.

Career
He was a star player on the Magruder High School basketball team.  Drafted out of Georgetown University by the Detroit Pistons with the 26th pick of the 1996 NBA Draft (the pick originally belonged to the San Antonio Spurs and went to the Pistons in the Dennis Rodman trade), he played four-plus years with the Pistons, becoming one of their key reserves. He was a fan favorite during his days playing for the Toronto Raptors due to his tenacious efforts on the court.

On February 22, 2001, Williams was traded from the Detroit Pistons, along with Eric Montross, to the Toronto Raptors in exchange for Corliss Williamson, Tyrone Corbin, Dávid Kornél and a future first-round draft pick. He was so enthusiastic about joining his new teammates that he immediately drove from Detroit to Toronto upon hearing the news.  In 2002-03 with the Raptors, Williams averaged 9.7 points per game, primarily as a starter, his career-best scoring average. In 2003, Williams also made a cameo appearance in the Disney Channel movie Full-Court Miracle.

In December 2003 Williams was traded again, this time along with Antonio Davis and Chris Jefferies, to the Chicago Bulls for Jalen Rose, Donyell Marshall and Lonny Baxter. Overall in 2003-04, Williams played in 68 games, starting 44 of them, averaging 6.2 points and 7.0 rebounds per game. During the 2004 offseason, he was involved in yet another trade, one that sent him and Jamal Crawford to the New York Knicks for Dikembe Mutombo, Frank Williams, Othella Harrington and Cezary Trybanski. His relocation to New York meant a relegation to the bench, as he played about 17 minutes per game.

On August 15, 2005, the Knicks waived Williams to avoid luxury taxes on his salary, as part of the NBA's new labor agreement. He announced his retirement from his playing career less than 48 hours later. Williams played in 587 games over nine seasons, averaging 6.6 points and 6.4 rebounds per game.

Post-playing career
Williams joined the NBA's "Basketball Without Borders" program, an effort to teach the game and bring resources to underdeveloped nations in Africa, Asia and elsewhere. In Toronto, he was always greeted with a standing ovation when he returned in a Bulls or Knicks uniform. Nicknamed the Junk Yard Dog (or JYD) by Rick Mahorn in his early days as a Detroit Piston for his hard work and hustle (as stated in an interview while he served as a commentator on NBA TV), Williams sometimes referred to himself in the third person.

On January 25, 2006, Williams rejoined the Toronto Raptors as their community representative.

Williams also played a minor role in the Canadian FBI show, Sue Thomas: F.B. Eye. He played Otis Washington, a dealer turned informant.

Williams was hired as Director of Player Development for the national champion Findlay Prep basketball team before becoming assistant coach. In the summer of 2013, Jerome was promoted to the position of Head Coach at Findlay Prep. He stepped down as head coach in the summer of 2014.

Williams continues to be a part of youth development through basketball as he was appointed the President of The Young3 which holds 3-on-3 tournaments for young people ages 9–14.

Williams and other basketball legends have implemented a digital educational program throughout North America, called Shooting For Peace.

References

External links
Williams's NBA.com blog about Basketball Without Borders
Williams's stats @ basketball-reference.com
Shooting For Peace Program Powered By Basketball Legends

1973 births
African-American basketball players
American expatriate basketball people in Canada
American men's basketball players
Basketball players from Washington, D.C.
Big3 players
Detroit Pistons draft picks
Chicago Bulls players
Detroit Pistons players
Georgetown Hoyas men's basketball players
Junior college men's basketball players in the United States
Living people
Montgomery College alumni
New York Knicks players
Power forwards (basketball)
Toronto Raptors players
21st-century African-American sportspeople
20th-century African-American sportspeople
American men's 3x3 basketball players